Oskar Snorre Olsen Frigast (born 26 January 1999) is a Danish footballer who plays as goalkeeper for HB Køge in the Danish 1st Division.

Youth career
Snorre joined Lyngby BK at the age of 13. Before joining Lyngby, Snorre played in Vejby-Tisvilde Fodbold and later in a short period for Helsinge Fodbold.

Career

Lyngby BK
In October 2016, Lyngby BK announced that they had extended the contract of 17-year old Snorre until June 2019. After signing the contract, Snorre became the third choice on the goalkeeper position on the first team squad.

On 18 August 2019, Snorre was loaned out to Norwegian club FK Haugesund for the rest of 2019. Lyngby announced at the same time, that they had extended the players contract until the end of 2020.

HB Køge
On 29 August 2020 it was confirmed, that Snorre had joined Danish 1st Division club HB Køge on a deal until June 2023.

References

External links
Oskar Snorre at DBU

 

1999 births
Living people
Danish men's footballers
Danish expatriate men's footballers
Denmark youth international footballers
Denmark under-21 international footballers
Lyngby Boldklub players
FK Haugesund players
HB Køge players
Danish Superliga players
Danish 1st Division players
Eliteserien players
Association football goalkeepers
Expatriate footballers in Norway
Danish expatriate sportspeople in Norway